Senator Chambers may refer to:

Members of the United States Senate
Ezekiel F. Chambers (1788–1867),  U.S. Senator from Maryland from 1826 to 1834
Henry H. Chambers (1790–1826), U.S. Senator from Alabama from 1825 to 1826

United States state senate members
David Chambers (congressman) (1780–1864), Ohio State Senate
Ernie Chambers (born 1937), Nebraska State Senate
George Chambers (New York politician) (1815–1880), New York State Senate